Jedediah Vincent Huntington, (alt. Jedidiah) was a clergyman and novelist. He was born 20 January 1815, in New York City, the son of Benjamin Huntington Jr. and Faith Trumbull Huntington. He died 10 March 1862, at Pau, France.

Biography
He received his early education at home and at an Episcopalian private school. He entered Yale College and later the University of New York, where he graduated in 1835. He then studied medicine at the University of Pennsylvania, received his degree in 1838, but never practiced his profession. During the three years following he was professor of mental philosophy in St. Paul's Episcopal school near Flushing, L. I., and at the same time studied for the ministry under William Augustus Muhlenberg. In 1841 he was ordained a minister of the Protestant Episcopal Church, resigned his professorship, and became rector of the Episcopal church at Middlebury, Vermont. At the end of five years he resigned because of doubts about his religious position, and went to Europe. The next three years he spent mostly in England and in Rome. He left England apparently a firm believer in the Anglican theory of the "Via media". The authority of Rome outside the British possessions he readily accepted. Soon after his arrival in Rome, however, he became convinced that his duty lay in recognizing the exclusive authority of the Roman Catholic Church. On speaking of the subject to his wife, he was agreeably surprised to learn that she was of one mind with him. Accordingly, they were both received into the Roman Catholic Church in 1849.

Returning to America he lectured before learned associations in several of the large cities. He became editor of the Metropolitan Magazine, a Catholic periodical published in Baltimore, and later edited The Leader published in St. Louis; each proved a failure. His life was, however, a literary life, and fairly successful. The last few years of his life were spent at Pau, in the south of France, where he died of pulmonary tuberculosis in his forty-eighth year.

Writings
His first publication was a book of verse. He made several translations from French into English, including Ségur's Short and Familiar Answers to Objections against Religion.

Huntington is best known as a writer of fiction. His novels were widely read and received considerable notice in the leading journals in America and England. The criticism was often harsh and at times justly deserved, especially in the case of his first novel Lady Alice and its sequel The Forest. One of his best works is Alban, or the History of a Young Puritan, which is practically the history of his own life. His last work, which is best known and which is the only one reprinted, is Rosemary, or Life and Death.

References

External links

 Catholic Encyclopedia article
 
 
 The Divine Institution and Use of the Festival System of the Church, by Jedediah Vincent Huntington (1843)
 Narrative of a Voyage to the Northwest Coast of America, in the Years 1811, 1812, 1813, and 1814, Or, The First American Settlement on the Pacific (New York: Redfield, 1854), by Gabriel Franchère, translated by Huntington
 The Forest, by J. V. Huntington 1852 novel

1815 births
1862 deaths
Religious leaders from New York City
New York University alumni
Perelman School of Medicine at the University of Pennsylvania alumni
19th-century American Episcopal priests
Anglican priest converts to Roman Catholicism
American Roman Catholics
19th-century American novelists
19th-century deaths from tuberculosis
Tuberculosis deaths in France
Roman Catholic writers
American expatriates in France
American male novelists
Writers from New York City
19th-century American male writers
Novelists from New York (state)